Muhammad Arsyad (born on June 22, 1993) is an Indonesian footballer who currently plays for Pelita Bandung Raya in the Indonesia Super League.

References

1993 births
Association football midfielders
Living people
Indonesian footballers
Liga 1 (Indonesia) players
Pelita Bandung Raya players